Dargaud Marina is a French production company. It produces children’s animation, documentaries, and feature-length films.

Recent productions airing on French and foreign channels include:
 Valérian, co-produced by France 3.
 Boule & Bill/Billy and Buddy), co-produced by TF1.
 L'Ile de Black Mor (Theatrical).
 Les Aventures Fantastiques du Commandant Cousteau/Jacques Cousteau's Ocean Tales (France 3).
 Kitou Scrogneugneu (TF1), adapted from the book of the same name by A. Rocard, M. Degano, and F. Ruyer, published by Fleurus.
 The New Adventures of Lucky Luke (France 3).
 Les Fils de Rome/Roma, 101 AD on M6.
 Princesse du Nil/Princess of the Nile (France 2).
 La Dernière Réserve/The Last Reservation (TF1).
 Petit Potam (Little Hippo) on France 3.
 Monsieur Bonhomme/Mr Men and Little Miss (France 3).
Dargaud Marina’s productions are sold to television channels all over the world; it continues to expand its stock of audiovisual content, adding two or three new series each year.

Dargaud Marina is a Media Participations subsidiary.

External links
 Media Participations

References

French film directors
French television directors